Straža is a village in the municipality of Srebrenik, Bosnia and Herzegovina.

Demographics 
According to the 2013 census, its population was 188.

References

Populated places in Srebrenik

fr:Straža
hr:Straža, Bosnia and Herzegovina